The Ashley Library is a collection of original editions of English poets from the 17th century onwards, including their prose works as well as those in verse, collected by the bibliographer, collector, forger, and thief Thomas James Wise. The library was sold to the British Museum by his widow, Frances Louise Greenhaigh Wise, in 1937 for £66,000. It was named after the street in which Wise lived when he started the collection (Ashley Road, Hornsey Rise).

Scope
The Ashley Library is recognized as one of the most important collections of 19th-century English literary manuscripts. The collection spans the period from Coleridge to Conrad, with the emphasis on poetical manuscripts and the correspondence of writers, critics, collectors, and bibliographers. The collection is strong in manuscripts of the Younger Romantics and of the Pre-Raphaelites, together with Swinburne. Wise's lack of scholarship and his practice of dispersing related manuscripts throughout the collection, made it a particularly difficult library to catalog .

History
The original collection consisted of 7,000 volumes with the bookcases used to hold them. When the British Museum library cataloged the collection it was discovered that 200 volumes were missing, it is thought that these were sold by Wise in the 1920s.

Part of the collection was pre-restoration drama which Wise had been collecting since 1900. These works were compared with the British Museum's former collection at which point it was discovered that over 200 book leaves were missing and 89 of these matching leaves were found in the Wise volumes.  Henry Wrenn had built up a drama collection (housed in the University of Texas) and Wise had helped with supplying these volumes, when the Texas authorities sent relevant volumes for comparison, 60 of these books were also found to have been completed with thefts from the British Museum library.

Though allegations were published against Wise of theft and forgery in 1934, it was not until 1959 that a detailed scientific investigation was published by the Bibliographic Society. The conclusion supported the theory that Wise must have known that some of the books leaves added to his collection were stolen and that it was probable that he would have taken the leaves himself.

References

Notes

Citations

Sources
, 

,

Further reading

British Library collections